Elof Gösta Harry "Hagge" Geigert, née Johansson, (30 June 1925 – 14 February 2000) was a Swedish revue-writer, theater director, television entertainer, author, journalist and debater.

He was born in Lerdal, Dalsland, Sweden. In television he participated in several entertainment-topic shows. In 1958 he presented Måndagsposten on SVT, in 1975 he presented the talk show Gäst hos Hagge, amongst his guests were Lill-Babs, Anni-Frid Lyngstad, Agnetha Fältskog and Anita Ekberg.

During several years he wrote columns for Göteborgs-Posten, several of his columns was re-published in the book Hagge på hugget in 1990.

He was awarded the Illis quorum in 1998.

Geigert died in Gothenburg in 2000.

References

External links

1925 births
2000 deaths
Swedish actors
Recipients of the Illis quorum